Metarbela rava is a moth in the family Cossidae. It is found in Cameroon and Uganda.

The larvae feed on Macaranga species.

References

Natural History Museum Lepidoptera generic names catalog

Metarbelinae
Moths described in 1896